Skurfing is a towed water sport similar to waterskiing, in that an individual is pulled behind a boat on a tow rope. However, instead of water skis, the sport uses a skurfboard which is a floating platform the user balances on, similar to a surfboard, but typically much shorter, with two foot-straps that prevent falling off the board and three fins positioned on the bottom that make it easier to maneuver when the board is being towed. The word itself is a portmanteau of skiing and surfing. Skurfing is often considered the precursor to wakeboarding.

History 

Skurfing was inspired by an unknown man being pulled by a boat on a surfboard in Lake Havasu, Arizona. The boat was being towed behind a motorboat at planing speed with a tow rope similar to that of knee boarding and wakeboarding.  The planing speed of the motorboat was equivalent to the speed generated by a wave and allowed the skurfer to ride behind the boat the same way a surfer would ride a wave. One of the advantages of skurfing, when compared with surfing, is that when the water is flat, skurfing is still possible.

In 1985, California surfer Tony Finn invented the "Skurfer", a shorter, more narrow version of a surfboard with foot straps.

Although the "Skurfer" was originally trademarked by Tony Finn, the word skurfing was potentially first coined in New Zealand by surfboard shaper Allan Byrne. Byrne lent a surfboard to a man named Jeff Darby, in Queensland Australia who then started to make his own, and later came in contact with Finn, who would later produce the brand 'Skurfer' under royalty.

Prior to Tony Finn and the 'Skurfer', Australian surfboard shaper and inventor Bruce McKee, along with associate Mitchell Ross launched the world's first mass-produced plastic roto-molded construction skurfboard. Its original name was the "Mcski", later renamed "SSS" skiboard, or 'Wake-snake' in Australia. The board had adjustable rubber foot straps, a concave tunnel bottom, and a keel fin. Two smaller side fins were later added for greater hold and more maneuverability.

The launch of the product's American version being named the 'Surf-Ski' was in 1984 at Chicago's 'IMTEC' show. At the show, McKee also met Tony Finn who was the proposed Californian representative. Tony Finn went on to do his own negotiations with Darby, and the result were the US boards later launched under the 'Skurfer' brand name.

Skurfing has developed into its own unique sport but has also been used in adapting other sports such as surfing. Before skurfing was invented there were limitations to paddling onto larger waves when surfing because surfers lacked the speed needed to stay in front of the wave. Skurfing has shown the world the potential of big wave surfing by towing the surfer towards big waves. Therefore, giving the surfer the speed needed to catch the wave successfully.

Popularity 
The first Skurfer championships were televised on ESPN in 1990.

Surfing is highly popular in the state of Western Australia and in many other places in the world. Unlike most other water sports where the participant is towed, skurfing is not a professional sport and has no official competitions. It is a freestyle sport with highly individualistic style and form. There are no defined styles or conventions, rather it is about personal style.

Styles 
There are two main styles of water skurfing: noseriding – mostly used by people who surf on a longboard – or using cutbacks, carves, and other turns. 

The maneuvers on a skurfboard are similar to those on a surfboard. These maneuvers include:
 Cut-backs
 180° rotations
 360° rotations
 Serial jumps
 Power slides
 Freeriding

Freeriding is when the wake is surfed without the rope. First, the rider pulls themselves up the rope so that they are skurfing in the largest part of the wake. The rider then gently pumps the board to maintain speed and moves their weight further forward to help them stay on the wake wave. Once they are being propelled by the wake the rope is thrown back into the boat.

The latest style of skurfing is riding with the fins removed from the bottom of the board. This finless style requires more balance and finesse than having the fins attached. Not having fins limits cutbacks and carving, but allows the rider to spin the board around in a 360-degree rotation.

See also 
 Aquaplaning (sport)
 Wakesurfing

References

External links 
 Scurfing - Everything you need to know
 "A Brief History Of Wakeboarding: Slim Beginnings" wakereactor.com
 Palco, Janos "Wakesurfing: New inland water sport on the rise" January 3, 2014, Adventure Sports Network

Boardsports
Roller sports
Towed water sports